The first Krišjānis Kariņš' cabinet (Latvian: Kariņa 1. ministru kabinets) was the 40th government of Latvia, sworn in on 23 January 2019 after Krišjānis Kariņš was proposed as Prime Minister by President Raimonds Vējonis and elected by the Saeima and working until 14 December 2022, when Saeima passed a motion of confidence in the Second Kariņš' cabinet.

The government was supported by a coalition of The Conservatives, the Development/For!, the National Alliance, the For a Humane Latvia, and the Unity as was predecessor of Opposition government from Union of Green and Farmers Māris Kučinskis.

In accordance with the Constitution of Latvia, the Cabinet of Ministers, after the first session of the 14th Saeima, has resigned and continued as a caretaker government until a new government was formed.

The First Kariņš cabinet is so far the only government in democratic Latvian history to serve a full term of the Saeima.

Composition 
The cabinet consisted of Prime Minister Krišjānis Kariņš and thirteen Ministers.

The composition of the Kariņš cabinet was as follows:

History

Parking space scandal 
In November 2020, Minister for Environmental Protection and Regional Development Juris Pūce was involved in scandal, that is infamously called "Parking space scandal", that lead to his resignation from the post of Minister.

The unusual scandal emerged after Riga City Councilor Māris Mičerevskis, a former party colleague of Pūce's accused him of using a parking spot he was no longer entitled to during an interview on LTV's 'One on One' show.

The next day, Pūce denied trying to get a free municipal parking pass in Riga, claiming that correspondence with Mičerevskis on the subject was just a joke.

However Prime Minister Krišjānis Kariņš failed to see the sunny side and said he expected the Corruption Prevention and Combating Bureau (KNAB) to get involved this case. Māris Mičerevskis left coalition in Council of Riga claiming it was corrupt.

On 12 November 2020 Juris Pūce resigned, and after fierce talks between Development/For! Artūrs Toms Plešs was elected as Minister for Environmental Protection and Regional Development. He was the first minister born after independence restoration in 1991.

Health Ministers scandal 
Journalists and members of the public were left stunned as they coped with two simultaneous press briefings on 5 January 2021 following rumors in the morning that Viņķele would be dismissed over dissatisfaction with her vaccination plan.

In one briefing, Ilze Viņķele outlined the Health Ministry's vaccination plans, while at exactly the same time Prime Minister Kariņš was announcing that he had lost confidence in his minister, due to the delay in presenting the vaccination plan she was presenting. He admitted not having read the plan himself, even as it was being presented in the parallel press conference. However, getting rid of Viņķele, whose own press conference seemed an attempt to show that a plan was indeed ready and had the backing of health professionals,

Viņķele herself signalled she would comply with the request to resign, while claiming that the vaccination plan that had been prepared was even more detailed than those adopted by Estonia and Germany.

She was dismissed on 7 January 2021. Although Vice-Prime Minister refused to take on Minister's position it was continued by Artis Pabriks for one day. On 8 January 2021 Daniels Pavļuts was chosen by Development/For! as the new Minister of Health. He was approved by Saeima by 61 votes out of 100.

Reshuffle

On 21 June 2021, New Unity, the New Conservatives, Development/For!, and the National Alliance signed a new memorandum on the objectives of their mutual cooperation. KPV LV was excluded from newly arranged coalition. This new coalition had 48 members, what meant that government officially became minority one.

Opinion polling

References

Government of Latvia
2019 establishments in Latvia
Cabinets established in 2019
Current governments